The 2006 United States Senate election in Minnesota took place on November 7, 2006. One-term incumbent DFL U.S. Senator Mark Dayton announced in February 2005 that he would retire instead of seeking a second term. The primary elections took place on September 12, 2006. DFL nominee Amy Klobuchar won the open seat.

DFL primary

Candidates 
 Amy Klobuchar, Hennepin County Attorney
 Darryl Stanton, businessman

Campaign 
Klobuchar gained the early endorsement of the majority of DFL state legislators in Minnesota. A poll taken of DFL state delegates showed Klobuchar beating her then closest opponent, Patty Wetterling, 66% to 15%. As of June 30, 2005, Klobuchar had more cash on hand than any other candidate, nearly $1,100,000.

Klobuchar was endorsed by EMILY's List on September 29, 2005. On January 20, 2006, Wetterling dropped out of the race and endorsed Klobuchar.

Former Senate candidate and prominent lawyer Mike Ciresi, who was widely seen as the only other serious potential DFL candidate, indicated on February 7, 2006 that he would not enter the race. That removal of her most significant potential competitor for the DFL nomination was viewed as an important boost for Klobuchar.

The only other serious candidate for the DFL endorsement was veterinarian Ford Bell. Bell, a staunch liberal, ran on a platform of implementing single-payer healthcare and immediate withdrawal from Iraq. Klobuchar won the official DFL endorsement on June 9, 2006. Bell dropped out of the race on July 10 citing inability to compete financially and also endorsed Klobuchar.

Results

Republican primary

Candidates 
 Mark Kennedy, U.S. Representative from Minnesota's 6th congressional district
 Harold Shudlick, military veteran
 John Ulrich, military veteran

Campaign 
Kennedy had faced potential challenges from former U.S. Senator Rod Grams, as well as U.S. Representative Gil Gutknecht, but both men were persuaded by national GOP leaders to run for the House instead. (Grams lost to Representative Jim Oberstar, while Gutknecht lost his reelection bid to Tim Walz.)

Results

Independence primary

Candidates 
 Robert Fitzgerald, public-access television executive
 Miles W. Collins
 Stephen Williams, salesman

Results

General election

Candidates

Major 
 Mark Kennedy (R), U.S. Congressman
 Amy Klobuchar (D), Hennepin County Attorney
 Robert Fitzgerald (IPM), public-access television cable TV show director

Minor 
 Michael Cavlan (G), nurse and independent journalist
 Ben Powers (C), quality control technician
 Peter Idusogie (I), businessman (write-in)

Campaign 

Kennedy's routine support of President George W. Bush in House votes appeared to be a central issue for Democrats in the campaign. In June 2006, allegations were made that many references to and photos of Bush had been removed from Kennedy's official U.S. House website; in rebuttal, Republicans said that there were 72 references to Bush on the website and that the changes noted by critics had been made some time ago, as part of the normal updating process.  Ben Powers was the only ballot-qualified candidate not invited to appear on Minnesota Public Television's Almanac program, despite Powers's offer to fill the space left unfilled by Klobuchar's decision not to appear with Kennedy and Fitzgerald on the program. Green candidate Michael Cavlan appeared on the program twice during the campaign as a special guest.

Debates 
Complete video of debate, September 19, 2006
Complete video of debate, October 15, 2006
Complete video of debate, October 29, 2006

Predictions

Polling 
After the release of the Minnesota Poll on September 17, 2006, showing Klobuchar ahead by 24%, Kennedy's campaign issued a statement  from Joe Pally, the campaign's communications director. He claimed that the margin was exaggerated because of bias by the Star Tribune and that the poll "is clearly more about discouraging Kennedy supporters than on reflecting the true status of one of the most closely contested Senate races in the country.". This press release came in the wake of news that the Republican party was scaling back funding for Kennedy's election campaign to shore up campaigns in states seen as winnable. Kennedy's campaign frequently accused the Star Tribune of bias in favor of Klobuchar, whose father was an editorial columnist and sportswriter for the paper until his retirement.  A subsequent poll by Rasmussen Reports showed a similar lead for Klobuchar and the St. Paul Pioneer Press also showed Klobuchar with a 15% lead in September. Klobuchar won the November 7 election by more than 20 percentage points.

Results 
The race was, as expected, not close, with Klobuchar winning decisively. She did well in major cities, such as Minneapolis and St. Paul, while Kennedy did well only in smaller, less populated counties. The turnout was high, although not unusual for Minnesota, one of the highest voter turnout states. Official turnout came in at 70.64%.

See also 
 2008 United States Senate election in Minnesota
 2006 United States Senate elections
 2006 Minnesota gubernatorial election

References

External links 
 Klobuchar's campaign website
 Kennedy's campaign website
 Fitzgerald's campaign website
 Powers' campaign website
 Pro-Kennedy weblog covering the MN Senate Race
 DFL website covering the MN Senate race
 Full list of U.S. Senate Candidates in Minnesota - From E-Democracy.Org
 Election results
 Debate, October 15

Minnesota United States Senator
2006
2006 Minnesota elections
Amy Klobuchar